Hughes v. Alexandria Scrap Corp., 426 U.S. 794 (1976), was a case argued before the Supreme Court of the United States.  Maryland created a program that, 1) purchased junked cars, 2) paid a bounty for those with Maryland license plates and, 3) imposed more stringent documentation requirements on out-of-state processors, in an effort to reduce the number of abandoned cars in Maryland. 

The Issue before the Court is whether such a program violates the Dormant Commerce Clause—essentially, whether Maryland could Constitutionally discriminate or burden interstate commerce by imposing more stringent documentation requirements on out-of-state processors or favoring in-state car dealerships when they purchase junk cars.  

Unlike previous Dormant Commerce Clause cases, Maryland was acting like a market participant (as opposed to a state regulator).  In such instances, the Court determined that a state actor can favor its own citizens over the foreign citizens. 

This case created the "market participant" exception to the general restrictions on states imposed by the Dormant Commerce Clause.  

Determining when a state is acting like a "market participant" rather than as a regulator was not decided by this case, but found in South Central Timber Development v. Wunnicke.

See also
List of United States Supreme Court cases, volume 426

References

External links
 

United States Constitution Article One case law
United States Dormant Commerce Clause case law
United States Supreme Court cases
United States Supreme Court cases of the Burger Court
1976 in United States case law
Vehicle recycling